Kiss 40 (also known as Kiss 40 Years: Decades of Decibels) is a compilation released by Kiss to celebrate the band's 40th anniversary.

Information
The album contains one track from every album the band has released over their 40-year career including live albums, the 1978 solo albums, as well as songs from compilations and from the three instant live albums, which are commercially available for the first time. There is one unreleased song: "Reputation".

The album is the first released by the band since their induction into the Rock and Roll Hall of Fame.

A limited-edition Best Buy exclusive version was released that came with a T-shirt.

The Japanese edition features an exclusive track, "Hell or Hallelujah (Live at Budokan 2013)".

Reception
Reception for the album has been mostly positive. In David Jeffries' review for AllMusic, he praised the album for being "filled with classics and desirable extras" but questioned the album's "odd one song-per-album rule" before finishing the review by commenting that "this is a triumph of format and the band's longevity, but not necessarily a knockout introduction".

Track listing

Chart performance

Certifications

Personnel
Paul Stanley – rhythm guitar (disc 1, tracks 1-5, 7-11, 15-22; disc 2), lead vocals (disc 1, tracks 3, 5, 10-11, 15-17, 20-22; disc 2, tracks 1-5, 7-12, 14, 16-18), acoustic guitar (disc 2, track 7)
Ace Frehley – lead guitar (disc 1, tracks 1-5, 7-11, 14, 16-18; disc 2, tracks 10-11, 14), lead vocals (disc 1, track 14), acoustic guitar (disc 1, track 18)
Gene Simmons – bass guitar (disc 1, tracks 1-5, 7-11, 13, 16-22; disc 2), lead vocals (disc 1, tracks 1-2, 4, 8-10, 13, 18-19; disc 2, tracks 5-6, 13, 15), acoustic bass (disc 2, track 7)
Peter Criss – drums (disc 1, tracks 1-5, 7-12, 16-17; disc 2, tracks 11-12, 15), lead vocals (disc 1, tracks 6-7, 12), (for disc 1 tracks 16-17 credit only)
Eric Carr – drums, vocals (disc 1, tracks 18-22; disc 2, tracks 1-4)
Vinnie Vincent – lead guitar, vocals (disc 1, track 19, 21)
Mark St. John – lead guitar (disc 1, track 22) 
Bruce Kulick – lead guitar, backing vocals, (disc 2, tracks 1-6, 8-9), acoustic guitar (disc 2, track 7)
Eric Singer – drums, backing vocals (disc 2, tracks 5-9, 13, 15-19)
Tommy Thayer – lead guitar, backing vocals (disc 2, tracks 10, 12-13, 15-19)
with
Bob Kulick – lead guitar (disc 1, track 20)
Bob Ezrin – piano (disc 1, track 6)
Dick Wagner – acoustic guitar (disc 1, track 6)
Kevin Valentine – drums (disc 2, track 10)
Tobias Nievelstein – recording engineer (disc 2, tracks 16-17)
Anton Fig – drums (disc 1, tracks 16-17)

References

Kiss (band) compilation albums
2014 greatest hits albums